The Tired Outlaw (Italian: Il bandolero stanco) is a 1952 Italian comedy western film directed by Fernando Cerchio and starring  Renato Rascel, Lauretta Masiero and Lia Di Leo. The film's sets were designed by the art director Gianni Polidori.

Synopsis
In order to win over the woman he loves, the impoverished Pepito heads to become a gold speculator. Unexpectedly he becomes the richest man in town but also makes several enemies, as well as meeting the sympathetic singer Susana. When Carmen arrives to marry him, he discovers that she is league with the corrupt sheriff.

Cast 
 Renato Rascel as  Pepito
 Lauretta Masiero as Susana
 Franco Jamonte as Fred
 Tino Buazzelli as Paco
 Lia Di Leo as Carmen 
 Gigi Bonos as Priest
 Silvio Bagolini

References

Bibliography
 Curti, Roberto. Mavericks of Italian Cinema: Eight Unorthodox Filmmakers, 1940s-2000s. McFarland, 2018.

External links 
 

1952 films
1950s Italian-language films
Films directed by Fernando Cerchio
1950s Western (genre) comedy films
1952 comedy films
Italian black-and-white films
1950s Italian films
Italian Western (genre) comedy films
1952 Western (genre) films